Ellrich is a town in the district of Nordhausen, in Thuringia, Germany. It is situated on the southern edge of the Harz, 13 km northwest of Nordhausen. It is the northernmost settlement in Thuringia.

History

Second World War 

Personalities

Sons and daughters of the city 

 Wilhelm Wiegand (1851–1915), historian and archivist
 Wilhelm Apel (1905–1969), Hessian politician (SPD) and deputy of the Hessian state parliament
 Dietrich Haugk (1925–2015), film director and voice actor
 Rolf Hoppe (1930-2018), actor

References

Towns in the Harz
Nordhausen (district)